Delaware, New Jersey could refer to:

Delaware, Warren County, New Jersey
Delaware Township, Camden County, New Jersey, the name of Cherry Hill Township, New Jersey prior to November 7, 1961
Delaware Township, Hunterdon County, New Jersey